Marc Wilkins may refer to:

 Marc Wilkins (baseball) (born 1970), former Major League Baseball pitcher
 Marc Wilkins (geneticist), geneticist credited with the concept of the proteome
 Marc Raymond Wilkins, Swiss-British film director and screenwriter

See also
Mark Wilkins (disambiguation)